Gpremper is a web design and development company founded in 1998 with headquarters in San Salvador, El Salvador, and offices in other Central American countries and Germany. It is a web development outsourcing firm that contracts with companies and institutions such as HSBC El Salvador, Scotiabank, Central Reserve Bank of El Salvador, Puerto La Unión (CEPA), Comisión Ejecutiva Hidroeléctrica del Río Lempa, Correos de El Salvador, Salvadoran Stock Exchange, and Industrias La Constancia. Gpremper has a portfolio of more than 450 websites in over 10 years in the internet industry. The company has 35 employees.

Gpremper owns a website that promotes music of El Salvador, which in 2004 participated organizing a musical event with the embassies of France and Germany in El Salvador, highlighting the friendship between the two cultures. The site received the Arroba de Oro 2008 award as one of the best websites of El Salvador. The company is also the winner of the Arroba de Oro 2009

In 2001 Gpremper bought a search engine for Salvadoran sites called Buscaniguas, which was launched in 1995 before the appearance of Google and it claims to be one of the oldest Salvadoran websites. The founder and manager of the firm, Gernot Premper, who has been regarded as the avatar of Salvadoran music, is German but he lives in El Salvador since a couple of years ago.

According to Gpremper's website, after acquiring Cital Web Solutions in 2006, which was the company licensed by the Canadian internet franchise WSI to operate in El Salvador as WSI El Salvador, Gpremper became the largest web programming and design firm in El Salvador. Nevertheless, WSI is still operating in El Salvador.

On October 1, 2010, the company celebrated the official inauguration of its new building, still located in Colonia Escalón, San Salvador

References

External links
 premper.com

Companies of El Salvador